The LG Octane is a 3G phone for Verizon Wireless, released in October 2010 as a basic feature phone to replace the LG enV3. The Octane features a full QWERTY keyboard, as well as a 3.2 megapixel camera/camcorder with a built in flash. The LG Octane has since been retired. It features a side flip form factor, similar to the LG enV3 (2009), LG enV2 (2008), LG enV (2006), and the LG VX9800 (2005). Unlike the LG enV Touch of 2009 and the LG Voyager of 2007, the Octane does not feature a touch screen. 
Octane
Verizon Wireless